The Roman Catholic Church in Guinea is composed of one ecclesiastical province and two suffragan dioceses.

List of dioceses

Episcopal Conference of Guinea

Ecclesiastical Province of Conakry
Archdiocese of Conakry
Diocese of Kankan
Diocese of N’Zérékoré

External links 
Catholic-Hierarchy entry.
GCatholic.org.

Guinea
Catholic dioceses